Karačići may refer to:

 Karačići (Rogatica)
 Karačići (Srebrenica)

See also 

 Karačić, a surname